KNXT-LD (channel 53) is a low-power television station in Bakersfield, California, United States, affiliated with MyNetworkTV. The station is owned by My Central Valley, LLC. KNXT-LD's transmitter is located on Mount Adelaide.

History 

The station was started as K57HZ, transmitting on channel 57, on April 28, 2000, by Cocola Broadcasting. Cocola sold the station to the Roman Catholic Diocese of Fresno, which owned regional Catholic station KNXT (channel 49), in 2007 for $1.4 million. It then moved to channel 38 and became a translator of KNXT, which also appeared on Bakersfield cable systems.

In 2020, the diocese shut down KNXT owing to high costs. In the case of the Bakersfield translator, a digital television conversion also needed to be conducted. KIFR, a non-commercial educational station, was sold to Vita Broadcasting, while a commercial firm, My Central Valley, LLC, acquired the Bakersfield translator.

Newscasts 

KNXT simulcasts sister station KMSG-LD's newscast, and offers 2½ hours of news per week (30 minutes each weekday) with the San Joaquin Valley's only 8 p.m. newscast, My 53 News at 8:00, hosted by news director Austin Reed, which debuted April 1, 2022. The half-hour newscast immediately repeats.

Subchannels 
The station's digital signal is multiplexed:

References

External links 
 

Low-power television stations in the United States
NXT-LD
MyNetworkTV affiliates
This TV affiliates
TheGrio affiliates
Local Now affiliates
Television channels and stations established in 2000
2000 establishments in California